The 2001 Korean FA Cup, known as the 2001 Seoul Bank FA Cup, was the sixth edition of the Korean FA Cup.

Qualifying round

First round

Final rounds

Bracket

Second round
Six clubs won by default: Jeonbuk Hyundai Motors,  Seongnam Ilhwa Chunma,  Anyang LG Cheetahs, Daejeon Citizen, Pohang Steelers and Busan I'Cons.

Round of 16

Quarter-finals

Semi-finals

Final

Awards

See also
2001 in South Korean football
2001 K League
2001 Korean League Cup

References

External links
Official website
Fixtures & Results at KFA

2001
2001 in South Korean football
2001 domestic association football cups